Marshall Donell Johnson (born November 1, 1952) is a former American football wide receiver in the National Football League who played for the Baltimore Colts. He played college football for the Houston Cougars.

He had a kickoff return for a touchdown in the 1977 AFC Divisional Game between the Colts and Oakland Raiders known for having the Ghost to the Post play.

References

1952 births
Living people
American football wide receivers
American football running backs
American football return specialists
Baltimore Colts players
Houston Cougars football players